Alice in Ultraland is a 2005 album by experimental electronica group Amorphous Androgynous, which is a side project of The Future Sound of London.

The album
Like the duo's previous album, The Isness, Alice in Ultraland has a psychedelic feel, but has more electronica tracks. It features more of a funk and blues influence than The Isness.
It also includes an extended version of the discarded Isness track "Yes My Brother" (titled "The Prophet" here).

Track listing
All tracks by Garry Cobain and Brian Dougans

 "The Emptiness of Nothingness" – 6:18
 "The Witchfinder" – 7:28
 "The Witch Hunt" – 2:54
 "All is Harvest" – 6:39
 "Prophet" – 4:49
 "Indian Swing" – 5:10
 "The Seasons Turn" – 1:01
 "High and Dry" – 4:53
 "Yes My Brother (You've Gotta Turn Yourself Around)" – 4:59
 "In the Summertime of Consciousness" – 5:44
 "Billy the Onion" – 5:28
 "Another Fairy Tale Ending" – 4:03
 "The World is Full of Plankton" – 8:02
 "The Wicker Doll" – 3:00

Crew
 Mikey Rowe – piano, hammond
 Stu Rowe – electric guitar
 Tim Weller – drums
 Ben Owen – flute
 The Electric Gospel Choir – female vocals
 Gary Lucas – electric guitar and acoustic bottleneck
 Dave Sanderson – vocals
 Baluji Shrivastav – sitar, tablas, dilruba
 Billy 'The Onion' Jones – harmonica
 Doree Jackson – female vocal
 Lysa – The 'witches' violin bow at the Nursery engineered by Lysa
 Mutant Funkoid – growler bass
 Stakrak – additional FX processing using the soundprok K46
 The Daughters of The Goddess 'The New Love Poetry' – narration
 Herb Moons – percussion from 'electromagnetic machines and psychedelic dreams
 Daniel Pemberton – piano, keyboards
 B. Dougans and G. Cobain – composition, production, arrangements, engineering.

The Witchfinder

"The Witchfinder" was released as a promo-single in 2005. The one-track promo is a radio-only version, which also featured on the song's animated video.

Track listing
 The Witch Finder (Radio Edit) (3:58)

Crew
 Engineer – Yage
 Producer – FSOL

References

External links
 
 

2005 albums
The Future Sound of London albums
Harvest Records albums